W34EY-D, virtual channel 38 (UHF digital channel 34), is a low-powered Newsy-affiliated television station licensed to Huntsville, Alabama, United States. Founded on January 12, 1993, the station is owned by HC2 Holdings. The station was owned by 3ABN until 2017, when it was included in a $9.6 million sale of 14 stations to HC2 Holdings.

Digital channels
The station's digital signal is multiplexed:

References

External links

Innovate Corp.
34EY-D
Television channels and stations established in 1997
Low-power television stations in the United States
1997 establishments in Alabama